Eymür is a village in the Demirözü District, Bayburt Province, Turkey. Its population is 83 (2021).

References

Villages in Demirözü District